Worapoj Petchkoom (born May 18, 1981) is a Thai boxer who competed in the bantamweight (54 kg) at the 2004 Summer Olympics and won the silver medal losing to Cuban superstar Guillermo Rigondeaux. He qualified for the Athens Games by ending up in first place in the 2nd AIBA Asian 2004 Olympic Qualifying Tournament in Karachi, Pakistan. In the final he defeated India's Diwakar Prasad.

Amateur career
In 2005 he competed for Thailand at the Boxing World Cup in Moscow, Russia, losing both his matches in the preliminary round. At the Asian Games 2006 he lost to eventual winner Joan Tipon 13:13 (countback).  At the world 2007 he was upset by Hungarian David Oltvanyi 9:10 in an early round.

Olympic results
2004 (as a bantamweight)
Defeated Kim Won-Il (South Korea) RSC 3 (1:47)
Defeated Khavazhi Khatsigov (Belarus) 33-18
Defeated Nestor Bolum (Nigeria) 29-14
Defeated Aghasi Mammadov (Azerbaijan) 27-19
Lost to Guillermo Rigondeaux Ortiz (Cuba) 13-22

2008 (as a bantamweight)
1st round bye
Defeated Vittorio Parrinello (Italy) 12-1
Lost to Yankiel León (Cuba) 2-10

World Amateur Championships results
2007 (as a bantamweight)
Defeated Joan Tipon (Philippines) 13-5
Lost to David Oltvanyi (Hungary) 9-10

2009 Ban
In 2009, Petchkoom was banned from boxing for 3 months after he posed for photos in the gay lifestyle magazine Stage.

References

External links
 Asian Games 2006
 

Boxers at the 2004 Summer Olympics
Boxers at the 2008 Summer Olympics
Worapoj Petchkoom
Worapoj Petchkoom
1981 births
Living people
Olympic medalists in boxing
Asian Games medalists in boxing
Boxers at the 2006 Asian Games
Boxers at the 2010 Asian Games
Medalists at the 2004 Summer Olympics
Worapoj Petchkoom
Worapoj Petchkoom
Worapoj Petchkoom
Worapoj Petchkoom
Medalists at the 2006 Asian Games
Medalists at the 2010 Asian Games
Southeast Asian Games medalists in boxing
Worapoj Petchkoom
Competitors at the 1999 Southeast Asian Games
Competitors at the 2003 Southeast Asian Games
Competitors at the 2005 Southeast Asian Games
Competitors at the 2007 Southeast Asian Games
Bantamweight boxers
Worapoj Petchkoom